Leo Borg (born 15 May 2003) is a Swedish tennis player. He has a career high ATP singles ranking of world No. 506, achieved in January 2023. He is the son of 11-time Grand Slam champion and former world number 1 Björn Borg.

Junior career
Borg excelled on the ITF junior circuit, defeating world No. 1 junior Bruno Kuzuhara in the final of the Porto Alegre in Brazil, one of the top junior tournaments, in March 2021. Borg also qualified for and played in the 2021 junior Grand Slams, including Wimbledon. His junior ranking peaked at #12 in the world.

Professional career

He has received a number of wildcards in ATP Challenger events and ATP Tour qualifying and main events and competes regularly on the world ITF Tour.

Just after turning 18, Borg's singles ranking was world No. 2048 on 24 May 2021. In one year’s time, after numerous wins against higher ranked players, he progressed to world No. 787 in July 2022.

Borg made his ATP main draw debut at the 2021 Stockholm Open as a wildcard, where he lost in the first round to eventual champion Tommy Paul.

On September 11, 2022 he made his first professional final on the ITF Tour in Cairo, Egypt after which his men's world ranking jumped to No. 581.

Ranked No. 577 at the 2022 Stockholm Open as a wildcard, he met with world No. 31 Tommy Paul again in the first round, this time losing in three sets 7–5, 4–6, 1–6.

On October 30, 2022 Borg won his first professional title at the ITF tour stop in Sharm El Sheikh, Egypt.

Borg made the largest leap in the world tennis rankings of any professional player in the calendar year 2022, moving up over 1500 spots and ending the year at world no. 506.

ATP Challenger and ITF World Tennis Tour finals

Singles: 2 (1–1)

References

External links

2003 births
Living people
Swedish male tennis players
Tennis players from Stockholm
Björn Borg
21st-century Swedish people